The Italian Catholic diocese of Fossombrone existed in the province of Pesaro and Urbino until 1986, when it was united into the diocese of Fano-Fossombrone-Cagli-Pergola. It was a suffragan of the archdiocese of Urbino.

History

Fossombrone was included in the Donation of Pepin, but remained subject to the Duchy of Spoleto until 1198, when it passed under papal rule. It was then held in fief of the Holy See by different families: by the house of Este (1210–28), the Malatesta (1340-1445), the Montefeltro of Urbino, 1445-1631); from 1500 to 1503 it acknowledged the rule of Cesare Borgia.

Christianity was introduced there, according to Ferdinando Ughelli, by Felicianus of Foligno. The martyrologies mention several martyrs: Aquilinus, Geminus, Gelasius, Magnus and Donata, also a bishop, Timothy, and his daughter (4 February). The first bishop of certain date is Innocent, present at the synods of Pope Symmachus (504).

Bishops

Diocese of Fossombrone
Erected: 5th Century
Latin Name: Forosemproniensis
Metropolitan: Diocese of Urbino

Fulcuinus (Fulcinus) (1076–1086), present at the Council of Salona as legate of Pope Gregory VII to receive the oath of fidelity to the Holy See from Demetrius Zvonimir, King of Croatia and Dalmatia; 
St. Aldebrando Faberi (1119), who died at the age of 118 years; 
 Riccardo (date uncertain, attested in 1243); 
Addo Ravieri (1379), poet and littérateur; 
Gabriele Benveduto (1434–1449 Died) 
Agostino Lanfranchi (bishop) (1449–1469 Died) 
Gerolamo Santucci (1469–1494 Died) 
Paul of Middelburg (1494–1534 Died) 
Giovanni Guidiccioni (1534–1541 Died) 
Niccolò Ardinghelli (1541–1547 Resigned) Cardinal
Lodovico Ardinghelli (Luigi Ardinghelli)(1547–1569 Died) 
Alessandro Mazza (1569–1575 Resigned) 
Orazio Montegranelli (1577–1579 Died) 
Ottavio Accoramboni (1579–1610 Resigned) 
Giovanni Canauli (Cannuli) (1610–1612 Resigned) 
Lorenzo Landi (1612–1627 Died)
Benedetto Landi (1628–1632 Resigned)
Giovanni Battista Landi (1633–1647 Died) 
Giambattista Zeccadoro (1648–1696 Died) 
Lorenzo Fabri, O.F.M. Conv. (1697–1709 Died) 
Carlo Palma (1709–1718 Died) 
Eustachio Palma (1718–1754 Died) 
Apollinare Peruzzini, O.E.S.A. (1755–1774 Died) 
Rocco Maria Barsanti, C.R.M. (1775–1779 Appointed, Bishop of Pesaro) 
Felice Paoli (1779–1800 Appointed, Bishop of Recanati e Loreto) 
Stefano Bellini (1800–1807 Appointed, Bishop of Recanati e Loreto) 
Giulio Maria Alvisini (Aloisini) (1808–1823 Died) 
Luigi Ugolini (1824–1850 Died) 
Filippo Fratellini (1851–1884 Died) 
Alessio Maria Biffoli, O.S.M. (1884–1892 Died) 
Vincenzo Franceschini (1892–1896 Appointed, Bishop of Fano) 
Dionisio Alessandri (1896–1904 Died) 
Achille Quadrozzi (1904–1913 Died) 
Pasquale Righetti (1914–1926 Appointed, Bishop of Savona e Noli) 
Amedeo Polidori (1931–1961 Retired) 
Vittorio Cecchi (1961–1973 Resigned) 
Costanzo Micci (1973–1985 Died) 
Mario Cecchini (1986–1986 Appointed, Bishop of Fano-Fossombrone-Cagli-Pergola)

30 September 1986: United with the Diocese of Cagli e Pergola and the Diocese of Fano to form the Diocese of Fano-Fossombrone-Cagli-Pergola

Notes

Bibliography

Reference works
 pp. 698–699. (Use with caution; obsolete)
  p. 254. (in Latin)
 p. 156.
 pp. 198.
 p.  189-190.
 p.  204.
 p. 218-219.

Studies

Acknowledgment

Fossombrone
1986 disestablishments in Italy